Chloroclystis taxata is a moth in the family Geometridae. It is found on the Comoros.

References

External links

Moths described in 1981
taxata